Melaleuca pallescens is a plant in the myrtle family, Myrtaceae, and is endemic to the state of Queensland in Australia.  It has hard, furrowed bark and very small leaves that have the lower part of their upper surface pressed against the branches of the plant.

Description

The flowers are arranged in spikes at the ends of branches which continue to grow after flowering or sometimes in the upper leaf axils. The flowers are pink or mauve when they open but fade rapidly to white. The stamens are arranged in five bundles around the flowers and there are 5 to 9 stamens per bundle.

Taxonomy and naming
Melaleuca pallescens was first formally described in 1984 by Norman Byrnes in Austrobaileya as a new species. The specific epithet (pallescens) is a Latin word  meaning "ashen" or "wan" with the suffix -escens meaning "becoming", hence "becoming ashen", referring to the pale-coloured flowers.

Distribution and habitat
Melaleuca pallescens occurs in the eastern half of Queensland growing in heavy clay soils, near streams and other wet areas.

References

pallescens
Myrtales of Australia
Flora of Western Australia
Plants described in 1984
Taxa named by Norman Brice Byrnes